The European Biological Inorganic Chemistry Conference, or EUROBIC , is a biannual conference on Bioinorganic chemistry founded in 1992 that showcases the best work in bioinorganic chemistry. The conference is held in Europe but attracts scientists from all over the world. EUROBIC was the result of a merger of the Swiss-Italian SIMBIC conference and the French-German SAMBAS conference. The aim is to create a forum and promote collaboration between scientists in the highly multidisciplinary field of Biological Inorganic Chemistry, ranging from biology to inorganic chemistry.

Since 1994 (EUROBIC-2), the European Medal for Bio-Inorganic Chemistry, also called the EUROBIC award, is presented in conjunction with the conference, customary as part of the closing ceremony.

European Medal for Bio-Inorganic Chemistry

The European Medal for Bio-Inorganic Chemistry, also called the EUROBIC Medal or EUROBIC Award, was founded  after the first European Biological Inorganic Chemistry Conference (EUROBIC-1), held in Newcastle, UK, in 1992. In 1993 a basic endowment was raised and is kept by the Royal Society of Chemistry.

The medal has since been presented in conjunction with the EUROBIC conferences, held every second year. The selection committee is assembled by the EUROBIC secretary and consists of senior bioinorganic scientists from 6-10 different countries in Europe.

The award is presented to a European scientist, or a scientist with a career in Europe, for "Excellence and Impact in the field" of Bioinorganic chemistry. From 2008 the award is intended to be primarily dedicated to young or mid-career scientists in the field.

EUROBIC Medalists 
Source: Eurobics Award
2022: Maxie M. Roessler, Imperial College London.
2020: Aidan R. McDonald, University of Dublin, Ireland ; Prof. Kallol Ray, Humboldt-University Berlin, Germany
2018: Gilles Gasser, Chimie ParisTech, PSL Research University Laboratory for Inorganic Chemical Biology, Paris France.
2016: Christelle Hureau, Coordination Chemistry Laboratory - UPR CNRS 8241, Toulouse, France.
2014: Xile Hu, Ecole Polytechnique Fédérale de Lausanne (EPFL), Switzerland.
2012: Angela Casini, University of Groningen, the Netherlands.
2010: Martin Högbom, Stockholm University, Sweden.
2008: Roland K. O. Sigel, University of Zurich, Switzerland.
2006: Antonio V. Xavier, The New University of Lisbon, Portugal.
2004: Maria Arménia Carrondo, The New University of Lisbon, Portugal.
2002: Peter M. H. Kroneck, University of Konstanz, Germany.
2000: Simon P. J. Albracht, University of Amsterdam, The Netherlands ; Prof. Juan C. Fontecilla-Camps, University Joseph Fourier, France.
1998: Fraser A. Armstrong, University of Oxford, UK.
1996: Claudio Luchinat, University of Florence, Italy.
1994: Wilfred R. Hagen, Delft University of Technology, The Netherlands.

See also
 List of biochemistry awards

References

External links
Society of Biological Inorganic Chemistry website
EUROBIC-9 website
EUROBIC-9 proceedings 
EUROBIC-9 Medal introduction by Jan Reedijk
EUROBIC-10 website
EUROBIC-11 website
EUROBIC-12 website

Biology in Europe
Chemistry conferences
Science and technology in Europe